George Cox (November 17, 1834 – December 17, 1909) was mayor of the city of Ottawa, Ontario, Canada in 1894.

He was born on Saint Helen's Island in Montreal in 1834 and came to Ottawa in 1855. He served as alderman on city council from 1882 to 1888 and in 1891. He was unsuccessful in an attempt to become mayor in 1892, when Olivier Durocher was selected. He did not complete his term as mayor, resigning for health reasons.

He died in 1909 and is buried in Beechwood Cemetery.

References 
Chain of Office: Biographical Sketches of the Early Mayors of Ottawa (1847-1948), Dave Mullington

1834 births
1909 deaths
Anglophone Quebec people
Mayors of Ottawa
Politicians from Montreal